The Shedhorn Formation is a geologic formation in Montana. It preserves fossils dating back to the Permian period.

See also

 List of fossiliferous stratigraphic units in Montana
 Paleontology in Montana

References

 

Permian geology of Montana